Alexandru Manta (born 7 June 1977 in Bucharest) is a Romanian former rugby union footballer.

Career
Manta spent the majority of his career in France, playing for USC Terrasson (1998), Stade Aurillacois (1998/02), Bègles-Bordeaux (2002/03), Section Paloise (2003/06), Castres Olympique (2006/07), CA Brive (2007/09), Lyon OU (2009/13), La Voulte-Valence (2013/15) and CS Vienne (2015/16).

Manta made his debut for Romania in 1996 against Belgium, in an 83–5 win. He played three matches at the 2007 Rugby World Cup, scoring a try against Italy (18–24).

Honours
Club
Lyon
Pro D2
Champion: 2010–11

Pau
European Challenge Cup
Runner-up: 2004–05

International
Romania
European Nations Cup
Winner: 2006

External links
 
 
 

1977 births
Rugby union players from Bucharest
Living people
Romanian rugby union players
Rugby union number eights
Rugby union flankers
SCM Rugby Timișoara players
CA Brive players
Section Paloise players
Lyon OU players
Castres Olympique players
Expatriate rugby union players in France
Romania international rugby union players
Romanian expatriate rugby union players
Romanian expatriate sportspeople in France
Stade Aurillacois Cantal Auvergne players
CA Bordeaux-Bègles Gironde players